Afdeling was an administrative area during the Dutch East Indies colonial administration at the district level. The administrator is held by an assistant resident. Afdeling is part of a residency; an afdeling may consist of several Onderafdeling (kawedanan level ruled by a Dutch "wedana" called a Controleur) and a landschap headed by an Bumiputera called a hoofd or head.

In the plantation sector , afdeling is an administrative division of a garden.

See also 
 Dutch East Indies
 Inlands Bestuur
 Onderdistrict
 Pemboewan
 Kewedanan

References 

Colonialism
Dutch East Indies